The 1924–25 Indiana State Sycamores men's basketball team represented Indiana State University during the 1924–25 NCAA men's basketball season. The head coach was David Glascock, coaching the Sycamores in his first season. The team played their home games at William H. Wiley High School Gymnasium in Terre Haute, Indiana.

Staff
The coaching staff consisted of first year Head Coach David Glascock, assistant coach Art Strum and first year assistant coach Roy "Goose" Burris.  Glascock and Strum would remain with Indiana State and craft excellent coaching careers; Burris would build a professional career in the NBL as well as a minor league baseball player.

Roster
The Sycamores were led by “Pete” Van Horn, the team's leading scorer, with an 8.7 average. He was followed by Claude Story's 6.4 average.  Future minor league baseball star, Paul Wolf, was the third leading scorer; Wolf would return to Indiana State after his playing days and craft an outstanding career as the baseball coach, winning a number of conference titles.

Six lettermen formed the strength of the fourteen member roster.

Schedule and results

|-
!colspan=8 style=| Regular Season
|-

References

Indiana State Sycamores men's basketball seasons
Indiana State
Indiana State
Indiana State